Jiří Kotalík (22 July 1920 – 26 January 1996) was a Czech art historian and director of the National Gallery in Prague between 1967 and 1990. He was one of the members of Group 42. Kotalík remained at the National Gallery until his retirement in 1990.

References

1920 births
1996 deaths
Writers from Prague
Charles University alumni
Group 42
Czechoslovak historians
Herder Prize recipients
Czechoslovak writers